Sitharasur is a small village panchayat in Panruti Taluk in Cuddalore District in Tamil Nadu, India. Annagramam, Panruti, Palur, Cuddalore, are the nearby towns to Sitharasur. Sitharasur is reachable by Melpattampakkam Railway Station, Panruti Railway Station, Nellikuppam Railway Station.

Locality
It is located 18 km west of district headquarters Cuddalore. 184 km from the state capital Chennai and the nearest railway station in Melpattambakkam.

Education in Sitharasur
Panchayat union school
Govt high school
Ramakrishna primary school
M.R.K. primary school

Sitharasur panchayat
Baskar Natarajan is the panchayat president of Sitharasur.

Banks in sitharasur
Canara Bank
Indian Bank

Population
According to census 2011, The population is around 2500.

Business
Main business of this place is Agriculture. Crops cultivated are Sugar cane, Paddy, Serials, Chilli, Banana. The most notable is Betel leaves. The cultivated crops are sold in the nearest markets like Melpattambakkam, Panruti. The sugar cane cultivated here are exported to EID Parry India Ltd

Market
Nearby Market is in Panruti

References

Villages in Cuddalore district